Centennial Peak may refer to:

 Centennial Peak (Antarctica) 
 Centennial Peak (California) 
 Centennial Peak (Colorado) 
 Centennial Peak (Wyoming) 
 Centennial Peak (Yukon)

References